This is a list of transactions that have taken place before and during the 2020 BAL season, the inaugural season of the Basketball Africa League (BAL).

Transactions

To BAL

The season was postponed due to the COVID-19 pandemic in Africa and signings were continued later on, when the league was moved to May 2021.

Between teams

See also

References

Transactions
2020